was a Japanese avant-garde artist best known for his drawing series, including Anti-Atomic Bomb, Chronicle of Birds and Beasts, and Genealogy of Monsters. With Shigeo Ishii and On Kawara, he formed Seisakusha Kondankai (Producers' discussion group), which sought to create a new realism distancing itself from the legacy of Social Realism. Ikeda had begun with his proletariat Ude (arm) (1953), which looked toward surrealism by the omission of the worker's head.

References

External links 
 

Japanese painters
1928 births
Living people
Artists from Saga Prefecture